Epsin-1 is a protein that in humans is encoded by the EPN1 gene.

EPN1 is an endocytic accessory protein that interacts with EPS15 (MIM 600051), the alpha subunit of the clathrin adaptor AP2 (AP2A1; MIM 601026), and clathrin (see MIM 118960), as well as with other accessory proteins for the endocytosis of clathrin-coated vesicles.[supplied by OMIM]

Interactions
EPN1 has been shown to interact with REPS2, AP2A2 and EPS15.

References

Further reading